Qarawat Bani Zeid is a Palestinian village in the Ramallah and al-Bireh Governorate, located 22 kilometers northwest of Ramallah in the northern West Bank. According to the Palestinian Central Bureau of Statistics (PCBS), Qarawat Bani Zeid had a population of 2,915 inhabitants in 2007. Almost all of Qarawat Bani Zeid is under the complete control of the Palestinian National Authority, as it is located within Area A.

Situated close to the village mosque is the remains of a Roman pool, about 60 meters underground.

Etymology 
Qarawat Bani Zeid is named after the Arab tribe of Bani Zeid, that settled in the town after the Muslim Ayyubid victory against the Crusaders in 1187. The "Qarawat" portion of the name comes from the Arabic word Qaran, which means "central point", originating from the site's location between the major cities of Nablus, Jericho and Jerusalem. There is also speculation that the name comes from Qira, which means "place that respects guests". According to Palmer, the name means "the towns of Ibn Zeid, in the Beni Zeid district."

Location

History
Potsherds from the IA I-II, IA II, lA II/ Persian, Persian, Hellenistic,  Hellenistic/Roman, Roman, Byzantine, Crusader/Ayyubid and Mamluk eras  have been found in the village.

Ottoman era
In 1517, the village was included in the Ottoman empire with the rest of Palestine, and in the 1596 tax-records it appeared as Qarawa, located in the nahiye of Quds (Jerusalem) in the sanjak of the Mutasarrifate of Jerusalem. The population was 32 households, all Muslim. They paid a tax rate of 33,3% on agricultural products, which included wheat, barley, olive trees, vineyards and fruit trees, occasional revenues, goats and beehives; a total of 24,000 Akçe. Potsherds from the early Ottoman era have also been found.

In 1838, it was described as a Muslim village, called Kurawa, in the Beni Zeid district, north of Jerusalem.

In 1869, Victor Guérin found the village to have 300 inhabitants. He also noted a fragment of an ancient pillar.

An official Ottoman village list of about 1870 showed that Karawa had a total of 48 houses and a population of 200, though the population count only included men.

In 1882, the PEF's Survey of Western Palestine (SWP) described is as "a small village on a knoll, with ancient tombs, and a tank, surrounded with olives."

In 1896 the population of Karawa was estimated to be about 312 persons.

British Mandate era
In the 1922 census of Palestine, conducted by the British Mandate authorities, Karawa Beni Zaid had a population of 274 Muslims,  increasing in the 1931 census to 394, still all Muslims, in a total of 88 houses.

In the 1945 statistics the population was 500 Muslims,  while the total land area was 5,100 dunams, according to an official land and population survey. Of  this, 3,421 were allocated  for plantations and irrigable land, 219 for cereals, while 21 dunams were classified as built-up areas.

Jordanian era
In the wake of the 1948 Arab–Israeli War, and after the 1949 Armistice Agreements, Qarawat Bani Zeid  came under Jordanian rule.

The Jordanian census of 1961 found 928 inhabitants in Qarawat Bani Zeid.

Post-1967
Since the Six-Day War in 1967, Qarawat Bani Zeid has been under Israeli occupation.

After the 1995 accords, 99.7% of village land is classified as Area A, the remainder 0.3% is Area B. As of 2004, the village held no elections, but has a Village Council with representatives from each of the families who then choose a Mayor. Around 70% of the village supports the Palestinian People's Party (Communist Party), the rest support Fatah, Hamas or PFLP. About 60% of the workforce is unemployed.

Economy 
Qarawat Bani Zeid's main economic sectors are agriculture and traditional industries. The village's land area consists of about 8,000 dunams, 30% of which is built-up area,  another 30% is covered with crops or orchards and the remaining 40% consists of either unused land or roads. The main crops that are grown are lentils, vegetables, thyme (za'atar) and sage. Grapes, as well as olive and fig orchards are also grown in the village lands. Traditional industries include basket weaving from olive wood, wool and leather-making and food manufacturing, particularly cheese.

About 60% of the village's working population are unemployed. The 40% that are employed work mostly in farming, simple commerce or teaching. However, some inhabitants work in government offices in Ramallah. There are two mosques, a hammam, a library, a social club for teenagers and a women's club in Qarawat Bani Zeid.

Government 
Qarawat Bani Zeid is governed by a village council. Elections are not held; rather, the council — which has representatives from the village's prominent families — select a mayor. The primary political faction is the Palestinian People's Party (PPP) and Fatah, Hamas and the Popular Front for the Liberation of Palestine (PFLP) have minor influence in the village.

References

Bibliography

External links
Welcome To Qarawat Bani Zeid
Survey of Western Palestine, Map 14:    IAA, Wikimedia commons 
Qarawat Bani Zeid Village (Fact Sheet), Applied Research Institute–Jerusalem (ARIJ)
Qarawat Bani Zeid Village Profile, ARIJ
Qarawat Bani Zeid, aerial photo, ARIJ
 Locality Development Priorities and Needs in Qarawat Bani Zeid Village, ARIJ

Ramallah and al-Bireh Governorate
Villages in the West Bank
Municipalities of the State of Palestine
Bani Zeid